This is a list of yogurt-based dishes and beverages. Yogurt is a food produced by bacterial fermentation of milk. The bacteria used to make yogurt are known as "yogurt cultures". Fermentation of lactose by these bacteria produces lactic acid, which acts on milk protein to give yogurt its texture and its characteristic tang. Worldwide, cow's milk, the protein of which is mainly casein, is most commonly used to make yogurt. Milk from water buffalo, goats, ewes, mares, camels, and yaks is also used to produce yogurt in various parts of the world.

Dishes

 Churri – a spicy Indian side dish
 Çılbır – Turkish egg dish
 Jameed – Jordanian yogurt strained cheese
 
  Labanie

Soups

 Ash-e doogh –  Iranian Azerbaijani thick yogurt soup
 Cacık –  cold yogurt soup from Turkey
 Dovga –  Azeribijani yogurt soup
 Tarator –  Bulgarian cold yogurt soup with cucumbers and garlic
 Toyga soup –  Turkish yogurt soup
 Shakriya –  Levantine stew with lamb or beef.
 Yayla çorbası –  Turkish yogurt soup
 Okroshka –  Russian soup sometimes based on kefir
 Trahanas –  Cypriot soup made of sun-dried dough of cracked wheat and yogurt (for Turkish/Anatolian version see Tarhana).

Condiments
 Dahi chutney
 Greek yogurt or Labneh – strained yogurt
 Perugu Pachadi
 Raita – Indian, Pakistani and Bangladeshi yogurt side dish that can be sweet or savory
 Tzatziki – Greek yogurt dip

Beverages

 
 , cold yogurt beverage of Turkic origin
  – Bangladeshi curd drink mixed with coriander, mustard seeds, mint and other spices
 
  
 , Iranian cold yogurt beverage, sometimes with mint or sparkling water
 , Indian thick, cold yogurt beverage, can be savory or sweet or mixed with fruit 
  
  
 , Armenian cold yogurt beverage

Gallery

See also

 Fermented milk products
 List of dairy products
 List of fermented foods
 Lists of prepared foods

References

 

Yogurt-Based Dishes